John Stead (21 April 1854  26 August 1922) was a Scottish-born New Zealand politician. He was a losing candidate in the 1894 Invercargill mayoral election and 1896 Invercargill mayoral election. He was deputy mayor of Invercargill from 1915 to 1916 and mayor of Invercargill twice (1898–1899 and 1917–1921). He was the father of All Blacks rugby player Billy Stead.

Sources

See also
1898 Invercargill mayoral election
1917 Invercargill mayoral election

External links
John Stead genealogy

1854 births
1922 deaths
Scottish emigrants to New Zealand
People from Girvan
People from South Ayrshire
Invercargill City Councillors
Deputy mayors of Invercargill
Mayors of Invercargill
Burials at Eastern Cemetery, Invercargill